The West Gate Range is a mountain range in Churchill County, Nevada.

References 

Mountain ranges of Nevada
Mountain ranges of Churchill County, Nevada